This is a list of released animated television series made mainly with computer animation.

1990s

2000s

2010s

2020s

Upcoming

See also
List of computer-animated films

References

 
Lists of animated television series
Computing-related lists

fr:T'es où, Chicky ?